Elskere is a 1963 Norwegian drama film directed by Nils R. Müller, starring Ingerid Vardund and Wenche Myhre. Ludvina (Vardund) is considered a woman of loose morals in her small home town, and her only real friend is the orphaned girl Grethe (Myhre). When Ludvina becomes pregnant, she decides to raise the child without the help of a man.

External links
 
 

1963 films
1963 drama films
Norwegian drama films
Films directed by Nils R. Müller